Marcel Huijbens (born 2 December 1967) is a Dutch retired basketball player. For the majority of his career he was a player for Den Bosch. In 1997, he was named the Most Valuable Player of the Dutch league. He holds the record for most All-DBL Team selections with 7, shared with Kees Akerboom Sr.

Huijbens played 69 games for the Netherlands national basketball team.

References

1967 births
Living people
Heroes Den Bosch players
Amsterdam Basketball players
Dutch Basketball League players
Dutch men's basketball players
Centers (basketball)
People from Leiderdorp
20th-century Dutch people
21st-century Dutch people